Splendeuptychia is a genus of butterflies in the family Nymphalidae.

Species
 Splendeuptychia ackeryi Huertas, 2009 – Magdalena Valley ringlet
 Splendeuptychia ambra (Weymer, [1911])
 Splendeuptychia ashna (Hewitson, 1869)
 Splendeuptychia aurigera (Weymer, [1911])
 Splendeuptychia boliviensis Forster, 1964
 Splendeuptychia clementia (Butler, 1877)
 Splendeuptychia clorimena (Stoll, 1790)
 Splendeuptychia cosmophila (Hübner, 1823)
 Splendeuptychia doxes (Godart, [1824])
 Splendeuptychia furina (Hewitson, 1862)
 Splendeuptychia hygina (Butler, 1877)
 Splendeuptychia itonis (Hewitson, 1862)
 Splendeuptychia junonia (Butler, 1867)
 Splendeuptychia kendalli Miller, 1978
 Splendeuptychia latia (Butler, 1867)
 Splendeuptychia libitina (Butler, 1870)
 Splendeuptychia mercedes Huertas, 2011
 Splendeuptychia pagyris (Godart, [1824])
 Splendeuptychia purusana (Aurivillius, 1929)
 Splendeuptychia quadrina (Butler, 1869)
 Splendeuptychia salvini (Butler, 1867)
 Splendeuptychia telesphora (Butler, 1877)
 Splendeuptychia toynei Willmott & Hall, 1995
 Splendeuptychia triangula (Aurivillius, 1929)
 Splendeuptychia zischkai Forster, 1964

References

Euptychiina
Nymphalidae of South America
Butterfly genera
Taxa named by Walter Forster (entomologist)